"To Catch a Thief" is the twelfth episode of the Once Upon a Time spin-off series Once Upon a Time in Wonderland.

Plot

Revealed in flashback, the Knave hunts Alice per Cora's directive and finds himself striking a deal to get his heart back; Alice and the Knave's friendship is tested as he does Jafar's bidding. Meanwhile, the Jabberwocky attempts to free herself from Jafar's control and Jafar is confronted by his former partner.

Production
Adam Nussdorf & Jerome Schwartz were the writers for the episode, while Billy Gierhart was its director.

Reception

Ratings
The episode was watched by 3.35 million American viewers, and received an 18-49 rating/share of 1.0/3, down in the total viewers number but up in the demo from the previous episode. The show placed fourth in its timeslot and eleventh for the night.

Critical reception
Christine Orlando of TV Fanatic gave the episode a 4.2 out of 5, signaling positive reviews.

Ashley B. of Spoiler TV gave the episode a positive review. She said:

References

External links
 

2014 American television episodes
Once Upon a Time in Wonderland episodes